The Mutdapilly fossil locality is a fossil site in the geological formation Walloon Coal Measures of Queensland, Australia. It contains fossilized impressions of flora dating back to the Middle Jurassic.

References 

Jurassic Australia
Jurassic paleontological sites
Paleontology in Queensland